Alan Edward Closter is an American former professional baseball pitcher. He played on the United States national baseball team during the 1964 Summer Olympics. He pitched parts of four seasons in Major League Baseball between 1966 and 1973, pitching in a total of 21 games.

Career
Closter played college baseball at Iowa State University. He represented the United States in baseball at the 1964 Summer Olympics as a demonstration sport, one of seven pitchers on the team. He was signed by the New York Yankees as an amateur free agent before the start of the 1965 season.

Minor leagues
In 1965, Closter's first year in the minor leagues, he split his time between two teams, the Rookie league Johnson City Yankees of the Appalachian League and the single-A Greensboro Yankees of the Carolina League.  In the winter, Closter also spent time with the Yankees affiliate of the Florida Instructional League.

On November 29, 1965, Closter was selected by the Cleveland Indians in the Rule 5 Draft.  A few months later, on April 6, 1966, before ever playing a game in the Indians organization, Closter was purchased by the Washington Senators.  Closter played only one game in the Senators organization, pitching 0.1 innings against the Baltimore Orioles in his MLB debut, before being purchased again by the Yankees on May 3, 1966.

After returning to the New York Yankees organization, Closter finished the season with the Greensboro Yankees.

Closter spent the entirety of the 1967 season with the double-A Binghamton Triplets of the Eastern League.  Closter pitched in only 14 games that year, but made an impressive performance by going 40 with an ERA of 1.74 and 45 strikeouts.

In 1968, Closter began the season with the single-A Fort Lauderdale Yankees of the Florida State League.  Playing only five games there, he was quickly promoted to the triple-A Syracuse Chiefs of the International League.  For the rest of his career with the Yankees, Closter would bounce between Syracuse and the Major Leagues.  Between 1968 and 1973, Closter played a total of 249 games for Syracuse, winning a total of 69 games and losing a total of 58.

Major leagues
After making his Major League debut with the Senators in 1966, Closter wouldn't play another game in the MLB until 1971, when he made occasional relief appearances for the Yankees.  Closter made one start in 1971 against the Detroit Tigers on September 4.  He pitched 5.0 innings and allowed 5 hits and 5 earned runs, two of which were home runs.

Closter was traded to the Atlanta Braves on September 5, 1973, as the player to be named later as part of a trade that sent Wayne Nordhagen and Frank Tepedino to Atlanta in exchange for pitcher Pat Dobson.

In his remaining two seasons in the MLB, Closter only made 6 appearances between the Yankees and Braves, pitching 6.2 innings in relief.

Post-retirement
In 2006, Closter was elected to the Syracuse Baseball Wall of Fame.

Notes

External links
, or Retrosheet, or Pura Pelota (Venezuelan Winter League)

1943 births
Living people
Atlanta Braves players
Baseball players from Nebraska
Binghamton Triplets players
Greensboro Yankees players
Florida Instructional League Yankees players
Fort Lauderdale Yankees players
Iowa State Cyclones baseball players
Iowa State University alumni
Johnson City Yankees players
Major League Baseball pitchers
Navegantes del Magallanes players
American expatriate baseball players in Venezuela
New York Yankees players
People from Creighton, Nebraska
Richmond Braves players
Syracuse Chiefs players
Tigres de Aragua players
Washington Senators (1961–1971) players